Conradus is a masculine given name. It is often a latinisation of the name Conrad or Konrad, but is also a Dutch given name. People called Conradus include:
 Conradus Celtis (AKA Conrad Celtes, 14591508), German humanist and poet
 Conradus Dasypodius (AKA Cunradus, Konrad and Conrad Dasypodius, 15321600), Swiss mathematician
 Conradus de Pistoria, Italian composer
 Conradus Eubel (AKA Konrad Eubel, 18421923), German Franciscan historian
 Conradus Gesnerus (AKA Conrad Gessner, 151665), Swiss naturalist and bibliographer
 Conradus Hirsaugiensis (AKA Conrad of Hirsau), German Benedictine monk and writer
 Conradus Leemans (180993), Dutch Egyptologist
 Conradus Megenbergensis (AKA Conrad of Megenberg, 130974), German Catholic writer and scholar
 Conradus Mutianus (AKA Konrad Mutian, 14701526), German humanist
 Conradus Sapientis (AKA Konrad Witz, 1400/14101445/1446), German painter
 Conradus Saxo (AKA Conrad of Saxony and Conradus Holyinger, before 12451279), German Franciscan friar and writer
 Conradus Viëtor (15881657), Dutch Lutheran minister whose portrait was painted by Frans Hals
 Conradus Vorstius (AKA Conrad Vorstius and Conrad or Konrad Vorst, 15691622), German-Dutch Protestant theologian

See also 
 Conrad (disambiguation)
 Konrad (disambiguation)
 

Dutch masculine given names